The Yemeni ambassador in Beijing is the official representative of the Government in Aden to the Government of the China with coaccredition in Pyongyang and Hanoi.

List of ambassadors

South Yemen 
People's Democratic Republic (South Yemen)

List of ambassadors

See also 
China–Yemen relations

References

 
China
Yemen